The Karlskrona Manifesto for sustainability design in software was created as an output of the Third International Workshop on Requirements Engineering for Sustainable Systems (RE4SuSy) held in Karlskrona, Sweden, co-located with the 22nd IEEE International Requirements Engineering Conference (RE'14). The manifesto arose from a suggestion in the paper by Christoph Becker, "Sustainability and Longevity: Two Sides of the Same Quality?" that sustainability is a common ground for several disciplines related to software, but that this commonality had not been mapped out and made explicit and that a focal point of reference would be beneficial.

External links
 Third International Workshop on Requirements Engineering for Sustainable Systems (RE4SuSy)
 22nd IEEE International Requirements Engineering Conference (RE'14)
 Proceedings of the Third International Workshop on Requirements Engineering for Sustainable Systems
 Christoph Becker, Sustainability and Longevity: Two Sides of the Same Quality?
 Christoph Becker, Ruzanna Chitchyan, Leticia Duboc, Steve Easterbrook, Martin Mahaux, Birgit Penzenstadler, Guillermo Rodriguez-Navas, Camille Salinesi, Norbert Seyff, Colin Venters, Coral Calero, Sedef Akinli Kocak, Stefanie Betz, The Karlskrona manifesto for sustainability design
 Karlskrona Manifesto for Sustainability Design Official site

References

Sustainability
Software design